Past and present television personalities on the NFL Network.

Current NFL Network personalities
 Kay Adams: (2016–present) host
 Jill Arrington: (2018–present) host
 LaVar Arrington: (2013–present) analyst
 Brian Baldinger: (2003–present) reporter/analyst
 Kyle Brandt: (2016–present) host
 Albert Breer: (2010–2016) reporter
 Bucky Brooks (2010–present) analyst/reporter
 Nate Burleson: (2016–present) host
 Charley Casserly: (2008–present) analyst
 Erin Coscarelli: (2014–present) host
 Victor Cruz: (2017–present) analyst
 Stacey Dales: (2009–present) reporter
 Dave Dameshek: (2012–present) fantasy analyst
 Charles Davis: (2007–present) analyst
 Eric Davis: (2012–present) analyst
 Terrell Davis: (2003–2012, 2013–present) analyst
 Spero Dedes: (2006–present) host/play-by-play
 Jamie Dukes: (2006–present) analyst
 Rich Eisen: (2003–present) host
 Michael Fabiano: (2012–present) fantasy analyst
 Alex Flanagan: (2006–present) host/anchor/reporter
 Cynthia Frelund: (2016-present) analytics analyst/expert
 Akbar Gbaja-Biamila: (2012–present) fantasy analyst
 Jay Glazer: (2010–present) analyst
 Rebecca Haarlow: (2011–present) reporter/host
 Scott Hanson: (2006–present) reporter/host
 DeAngelo Hall: (2019-present) analyst
 Dan Hellie: (2013–present) host/anchor/reporter
 Michael Irvin: (2009–present) lead analyst
 Kim Jones: (2007–2008, 2012–present) reporter
 Mark Kriegel: (2012–present) analyst
 Steve Mariucci: (2006–present) lead analyst
 Willie McGinest: (2012–present) analyst
 Randy Moss (2008–present) anchor/reporter
 Shaun O'Hara: (2012–present) analyst
 Tom Pelissero: (2018–present) reporter/analyst
 Kristina Pink: (2018–present) sideline reporter
 Ian Rapoport: (2012–present) reporter/analyst
 Lindsay Rhodes: (2009–present) anchor/reporter
 Chris Rose: (2012–present) host
 Peter Schrager: (2016–present) host
 Shannon Sharpe: (2018–present) analyst
 Sterling Sharpe: (2003–present) analyst
 Brad Sham: (2007–present) play-by-play
 Andrew Siciliano: (2012–present) host
 Jane Slater: (2016–present) host/reporter
 Matt "Money" Smith: (2011–present) fantasy analyst
 Melissa Stark: (2011–present) host/reporter
 Joe Theismann: (2009–present) analyst
 Amber Theoharis: (2012–present) host
 LaDainian Tomlinson: (2012–present) analyst
 Kurt Warner: (2010–present) analyst
 Heidi Watney: (2022–present) host/reporter
 Sara Walsh: (2019–present) host/reporter
 Solomon Wilcots: (2003–present) analyst
 Ari Wolfe: (2010–present) host/reporter
 Colleen Wolfe: (2014–present) host
 Steve Weissman: (2015–present) host
 Steve Wyche: (2009–present) analyst
 David Carr: (2016-present) analyst

Former NFL Network personalities
 Elliot Harrison (?-2019) host of power rankings 
 Ernie Accorsi: (2008) analyst
 Troy Aikman: (2018–2021) analyst
 Jennifer Allen: (2004–2012) features reporter
 Marcus Allen: (2005–2006) analyst
 Bobby Beathard: (2007) analyst
 Michelle Beisner: (2006–2013)  reporter/anchor
 Jerome Bettis: (2009–2012) reporter
 Brian Billick: (2012–2022) analyst
 James Brown: (2014–2017) host
 Joe Buck: (2018–2021) play-by-play
 Paul Burmeister: (2004–2014) host/play-by-play
 Fran Charles: (2006–2014) host
 Cris Collinsworth: (2006–2008; 2016–2017) analyst
 Bob Costas: (2016–2017) host
 Bill Cowher (2014–2017) analyst
 Heather Cox: (2016–2017) sideline reporter
 Jeff Darlington: (2011–2016) reporter
 Butch Davis: (2003–2006) analyst
 Terry Donahue: (2007–2008) college football analyst
 Tony Dungy: (2016–2017) analyst
 Heath Evans: (2011–2017) analyst
 Marshall Faulk: (2006–2017) lead analyst
 Dennis Green: (2012–2016) analyst
 Bryant Gumbel: (2006–2007) play-by-play
 Rodney Harrison: (2016–2017) analyst
 Kara Henderson: (2003–2012) reporter/host
 Derrin Horton: (2003–2012) host/anchor/reporter
 Daryl Johnston: (2010–2012) analyst
 Seth Joyner: (2003–2004) analyst
 Lincoln Kennedy: (2003–2006) analyst
 Jason La Canfora: (2009–2012) reporter
 Michael Lombardi: (2009–2013) analyst
 Mike Mayock: (2003–2018) game analyst/college football guru
 Liam McHugh: (2017) host
 Donovan McNabb: (2012) analyst
 Al Michaels: (2016–2017) play-by-play
 Matt Millen: (2009–2010) game analyst
 Jim Mora Sr.: (2003–2012) analyst
 Jim Nantz: (2014–2017) play-by-play
 Brad Nessler: (2011–2013) play by play
 Ken Norton: (2003-2005) analyst
 Jesse Palmer: (2006–2007) analyst
 Bob Papa: (2007–2010) play by play
 Glenn Parker: (2003–2006) analyst
 Bill Patrick: (2003–2004) host
 Mike Pereira: (2003–2010) analyst
 Tony Romo: (2017) analyst
 Molly Qerim: (2012–2015) anchor
 Dan Reeves: (2003–2006) analyst
 Deion Sanders: (2006–2020) lead analyst
 Warren Sapp: (2008–2015) analyst
 Danyelle Sargent: (2012–2013) anchor
 Adam Schefter: (2003–2009) reporter
 Phil Simms: (2014–2016) analyst
 Emmitt Smith: (2005–2006) analyst
 Darren Sharper: (2012–2013) analyst
 Mary Strong: (2006–2012) anchor/reporter
 Dick Vermeil: (2006–2008) game analyst
 Tom Waddle: (2007-2014) analyst
 Tracy Wolfson: (2014–2017) sideline reporter
 Rod Woodson: (2003–2011) analyst
 Nicole Zaloumis: (2012–2014) host

References

NFL Network
Personalities
Lists of 21st-century people